Fluviphylax is a genus of tiny poeciliids native to the Amazon Basin, Orinoco Basin, and Oyapock Basin in South America.

Species
Five recognized species are placed in this genus:
 Fluviphylax obscurus W. J. E. M. Costa, 1996
 Fluviphylax palikur W. J. E. M. Costa & Le Bail, 1999
 Fluviphylax pygmaeus (G. S. Myers & J. de P. Carvalho, 1955)
 Fluviphylax simplex W. J. E. M. Costa, 1996
 Fluviphylax zonatus W. J. E. M. Costa, 1996

References

Poeciliidae
Freshwater fish genera
Fish of the Amazon basin
Ray-finned fish genera
Taxa named by Gilbert Percy Whitley